Muhammad Ibrahim or Jahangir II (9 August 1703 – 31 January 1746) was a claimant to the throne of the Mughal Empire.

Early life
Muhammad Ibrahim was the eldest son of Prince Rafi-ush-Shan, son of Emperor Bahadur Shah I.  His mother was Nur-un-nissa Begum, the daughter of Shaikh Baqi. He was the brother of Emperors Rafi ud Darajat  and Shah Jahan II. On 2 December 1707, he was given the rank of 7000, and 2000 horses.

Reign
On 15 October 1720, he was brought out of the prison and placed on the throne. He had been designated by the Sayyid brothers as his brother's successor. However, Sayyid Khan Jahan, the governor of Delhi, dreading with Ibrahim's reputation for violent temper, had substituted him with his cousin Roshan Aktar Muhammad Shah, son of Prince Khujista Akhtar Jahan Shah. He was defeated by Muhammad Shah in the battle of Hasanpur, and deposed on 13 November 1720. He was sent back to the prison in the citadel of Shahjahanabad. A quartrain quoted by Khush-hal Chand says, his day of power had been short-lived, "like a drop of dew upon a blade of grass."

Death
He died on 30 January 1746, at the age of about forty-three years.

Titles
His full title was:
Abul Fath Zahir-ul-din Muhammad Ibrahim.

Coins
Sikka bar sim zad dar jahan 
ba fazal-i-Muhammad Ibrahim, Shah-i-shahan

Silver was stamped in the world
by favour of Muhammad Ibrahim, the king of kings.

References

Bibliography
 

1703 births
18th-century Indian Muslims
1746 deaths
Mughal princes